The 1988 World Series of Poker (WSOP) was a series of poker tournaments held at Binion's Horseshoe between 5 May 1988, and 21 May 1988.

Preliminary events

Main Event
There were 167 entrants to the main event on 16 May 1988. Each paid $10,000 to enter the tournament. The 1988 Main Event was the second consecutive World Championship for Johnny Chan. The final hand that featured Chan against Erik Seidel would be featured in the 1998 movie Rounders.

Final table

Other high finishes
NB: This list is restricted to top 30 finishers with an existing Wikipedia entry.

References

World Series of Poker
World Series of Poker